Hossein Koushki (born 22 May 1984) is an Iranian footballer who played in the IPL.

Club career
Koushki joined Rah Ahan in 2009 after spending the previous season at Payam Mashhad F.C. He was released by Damash on last days of December 2012.

Club career statistics

 Assist Goals

Personal
Koushki is the younger brother of Mes Kerman player Bijan Koushki.

References

1984 births
Living people
Rah Ahan players
Payam Mashhad players
Esteghlal F.C. players
Damash Gilan players
Sanat Naft Abadan F.C. players
Saba players
Iranian footballers
Association football fullbacks